Steven De Neef (born 16 January 1971 in Asse) is a former Belgian professional racing cyclist, who competed as a professional between 1997 and 2011.

Career wins

1996
1st, Overall, Ronde van Antwerpen
2000
 1st, Wetteren
2002
 3rd, Schaal Sels
2003
 1st, Zele
  European Derny Championship, Nieuwpoort, Belgium
2006
 1st, Tienen
 3rd, National Team Pursuit Championship, Ghent (with Leys/Crabbé/Roelandts)
2007
 2nd, National Madison Championship, Ghent (with Dimitri De Fauw)
 2nd, National Derny Champion, Ghent
 3rd, National Points race Championship, Ghent
 3rd, National Derny Champion, Ghent

External links

1971 births
Living people
Belgian male cyclists
Belgian track cyclists
People from Asse
Cyclists from Flemish Brabant